Herbert Francis Searancke Huntington OBE (15 January 1888 – 1968) was a British fencer. He competed in the individual and team sabre events at the 1920 Summer Olympics. 

In addition to fencing Huntington was also a boxer and in 1912, was the Army and Navy Officers' middleweight champion. During World War I Huntington was a superintendent of physical training and was mentioned in dispatches when serving with the 2nd Welsh Regiment in France. In 1920, in addition to competing in the Summer Olympics he was the Services middleweight and heavyweight boxing champion.

In 1921, he won the épée title at the British Fencing Championships and won the Services heavyweight boxing title. He served at command headquarters before he retired in 1923 and later received an OBE.

References

1888 births
1968 deaths
British male fencers
Olympic fencers of Great Britain
Fencers at the 1920 Summer Olympics